GERMELA (acronym for GERman Middle Eastern Law Association) is a Hamburg-based full-service consultant with a focus on the MENA area, North Africa, and Asia. GERMELA has offices in Berlin, Zurich, Dubai, and Abu Dhabi in addition to its headquarters.

In addition, GERMELA has over 20 partner companies and 500 accredited lawyers and consultants in 17 countries in the Middle East and North Africa (MENA).  

GERMELA's Founder and chairman is Dr. Thomas Wülfing. While clients come from a variety of industries, GERMELA focuses on the automotive, health, and food and beverage industries.

History 

GERMELA was founded in 2008 as German-Middle-Eastern-Law-Association. It was originally a loose network of German and Middle-Eastern law firms and consultancies aiming to foster cooperation between the two regions. However, as GERMELA received a warm reception by businesses in Germany and the Middle East alike, it was quickly transformed into a full-scale consultancy.

In 2015, GERMELA opened a branch in Dubai. In early 2016, GERMELA launched the Dubai-based GERMELA LOOTAH Legal Consultancy, a joint venture between the German law firm WZR and the Emirati law firm Hussain Lootah & Associates.

References 

International management consulting firms
Macroeconomics consulting firms
Companies based in Hamburg